Cymindis kasakh is a species of ground beetle in the subfamily Harpalinae. It was described by Kryzhanovskij and Emetz in 1973.

References

kasakh
Beetles described in 1973